Henry William Saunders (1883 – 24 April 1942) played first-class cricket for Somerset in four matches in four different cricket seasons from 1911 to 1922. His exact date and place of birth are not known; he died at Uphill, Weston-super-Mare, Somerset.

References

1883 births
1942 deaths
English cricketers
Somerset cricketers